Checkered Flag or Crash is a 1977 American adventure comedy film about off-road racing through the Philippines jungle, starring Joe Don Baker and Susan Sarandon and featuring Larry Hagman, Alan Vint and Parnelli Jones.  It was written by Michael Allin and directed by Alan Gibson.

Plot
Hard-charging race car driver "Walkaway" Madden (Baker), nicknamed that because of his history of walking away from car crashes, just wants to win the big Manilla 1000 off-road race. Photojournalist C.C. Wainwright (Sarandon) intends to ride with him in that race. But Walkaway just wants to get rid of her.
Fast-talking promoter Bo Cochran (Hagman) wants the race completed by any means necessary.

Cast
Joe Don Baker as Walkaway Madden
Susan Sarandon as C.C. Wainwright
Larry Hagman as Bo Cochran
Alan Vint as Doc Pyle
Parnelli Jones as Himself
Logan Clarke as Ringer
Daina House as Rider in Black

Production
Susan Sarandon, Larry Hagman, and members of the crew dyed Easter eggs on Easter while under the influence of psilocybin mushrooms.

References

External links

1977 films
1970s adventure comedy films
American adventure comedy films
1970s English-language films
American auto racing films
Films directed by Alan Gibson
Universal Pictures films
1977 comedy films
1970s American films